George A. Loyd (May 9, 1844 – May 13, 1917) was a private in the Union Army and a Medal of Honor recipient for his actions in the American Civil War.

Medal of Honor citation

Rank and organization: Private, Company A, 122nd Ohio Infantry. Place and date: At Petersburg, Va., April 2, 1865. Entered service at. ------. Birth: Muskingum County, Ohio. Date of issue: April 16, 1891.

Citation:

Capture of division flag of General Heth.

See also

List of Medal of Honor recipients
List of American Civil War Medal of Honor recipients: G–L

References

External links

1844 births
1917 deaths
United States Army Medal of Honor recipients
United States Army soldiers
People from Muskingum County, Ohio
People of Ohio in the American Civil War
American Civil War recipients of the Medal of Honor